Shonkinite is an intrusive igneous rock found in few places in the world. It is unique in having low silica, feldspathoid minerals, and large blocky crystals of black augite. It makes up much of the hard dark grey rock comprising certain mountains and buttes in Montana that are remnants of laccoliths and stocks, such as the Highwood mountains.

Composition

Shonkinite is an intrusive igneous rock. More specifically, it is a mafic foidal (feldspathoid bearing) syenite, a holocrystalline (completely crystalline) intrusive rock which, is composed of potassic feldspar in the form of sanidine, nepheline, augite, biotite, and olivine. Shonkinite is also used for mafic nepheline syenite with aegerine-augite as the pyroxene, and with the addition of plagioclase (andesine to labradorite).

The close view of the rocks in the Adel mountains show large glossy crystals of augite in a dark grey matrix made up of small crystals of augite and feldspar. This is unusual as augite is usually dull.

Formation 

In central Montana buttes of shonkinite are capped with white layers of syenite. There appear round globes of syenite at the boundary which suggest that the less dense syenite float up to the top of molten shonkinite as the mass cooled.

Occurrence 

The Adel Mountains Volcanic Field in north-central Montana
Mountain Pass, California.
India in the Salem Block in the Southern Granulite Terrane and the Elchuru alkaline complex in India 
Ontario, Canada
Timor, Indonesia

Etymology

The rock gets its name from the type locality at Shonkin Sag in the Highwood Mountains of north-central Montana.

References

Plutonic rocks
Igneous petrology